The Mosin–Nagant is a five-shot, bolt-action, internal magazine–fed military rifle. Known officially as the 3-line rifle M1891 and informally  in Russia and former Soviet Union as Mosin's rifle, it is primarily found chambered for its original 7.62×54mmR cartridge.

Developed from 1882 to 1891, it was used by the armed forces of the Russian Empire, the Soviet Union and various other states. It is one of the most mass-produced military bolt-action rifles in history, with over 37 million units produced since 1891. In spite of its age, it has been used in various conflicts around the world up to the present day.

History

Initial design and tests
During the Russo-Ottoman War of 1877–1878, Russian troops armed mostly with Berdan single-shot rifles suffered heavy casualties against Turkish troops equipped with Winchester repeating rifles, particularly at the bloody Siege of Pleven. This showed Russian commanders the need to modernize the general infantry weapon of the army.

Various weapons were acquired and tested by GAU of the Ministry of Defense of Russian Empire, and in 1889 the Lebel M1886 was obtained through semi-official channels from France. It was supplied together with a model of the cartridge and bullet but without the primer and the smokeless powder. Those problems were solved by Russian scientists and engineers (the smokeless powder, for instance, was produced by Dmitri Mendeleev himself).

In 1889, three rifles were submitted for evaluation: Captain Sergei Ivanovich Mosin of the imperial army submitted his "3-line" caliber (.30 cal, 7.62 mm) rifle; Belgian designer Léon Nagant submitted a "3.5-line" (.35 caliber, 9 mm) design; and a Captain Zinoviev submitted another "3-line" design (1 "line" = , thus 3 lines = 7.62 mm).

When trials concluded in 1891, the evaluators were split in their assessment. The main disadvantages of Mosin's rifle were a more complicated mechanism and a long and tiresome procedure of disassembling (which required special instruments—it was necessary to unscrew two fasteners). Nagant's rifle was mainly criticized for its lower quality of manufacture and materials, due to "artisan pre-production" of his 300 rifles. The commission initially voted 14 to 10 to approve Mosin's rifle. At this point the decision was made to rename the existing commission and call it Commission for creation of the small-bore rifle, and to put on paper the final requirements for such a rifle. The inventors obliged by delivering their final designs. Head of the commission, General Chagin, ordered subsequent tests held under the commission's supervision, after which the bolt-action of Mosin's design was ordered into production under the name of 3-line rifle M1891.

The colloquial name “Mosin-Nagant” used in the West is persistent but erroneous, as established in 
Nagant's legal dispute.

Technical detail
Like the Gewehr 98, the 1891 Mosin uses two front-locking lugs to lock up the action. However, the Mosin's lugs lock in the horizontal position, whereas the Mauser locks vertically. The Mosin bolt body is multi-piece whereas the Mauser is one piece. The Mosin uses interchangeable bolt heads like the Lee–Enfield. Unlike the Mauser, which uses a controlled feed bolt head in which the cartridge base snaps up under the fixed extractor as the cartridge is fed from the magazine, the Mosin has a push feed recessed bolt head in which the spring-loaded extractor snaps over the cartridge base as the bolt is finally closed similar to the Gewehr 1888 and M91 Carcano or modern sporting rifles like the Remington 700. Like the Mauser, the Mosin uses a blade ejector mounted in the receiver. The Mosin bolt is removed by simply pulling it fully to the rear of the receiver and squeezing the trigger, while the Mauser has a bolt stop lever separate from the trigger.

Like the Mauser, the bolt lift arc on the Mosin–Nagant is 90 degrees, versus 60 degrees on the Lee–Enfield. The Mauser bolt handle is at the rear of the bolt body and locks behind the solid rear receiver ring. The Mosin bolt handle is similar to the Mannlicher: it is attached to a protrusion on the middle of the bolt body, which serves as a bolt guide, and it locks protruding out of the ejection/loading port in front of a split rear receiver ring, also serving a similar function to Mauser's "third" or "safety" lug.

The rifling of the Mosin barrel is right turning (clockwise looking down the rifle) 4-groove with a twist of 1:9.5" or 1:10". The 5-round fixed metallic magazine can either be loaded by inserting the cartridges individually, or more often in military service, by the use of 5-round stripper clips.

Initial production

The 3-line rifle, Model 1891, its original official designation, was adopted by the Russian military in 1891. Production began in 1892 at the ordnance factories of Tula Arsenal, Izhevsk Arsenal and at Sestroryetsk Arsenal. An order for 500,000 rifles was placed with the French arms factory, Manufacture Nationale d'Armes de Châtellerault.

Refinement
There have been several refinements and variations of the original rifle, the most common being the M1891/30 (commonly referred to as "the 91/30" by shooters), which was a modernized design introduced in 1930. Some details were borrowed from Nagant's design. 
 One such detail is the attachment of the magazine spring to the magazine base plate. In Mosin's original design the spring was not attached to the base plate and, according to the Commission, could be lost during maintenance, rifle cleaning. 
 Another detail is the form of the clip that could hold five cartridges to be loaded simultaneously into the magazine.
 One more detail is the form of the interrupter, a specially designed part within the receiver, which helps prevent double feeding. The initial rifle proposed by Mosin lacked an interrupter, leading to numerous failures to feed. This detail was introduced in the rifle borrowing from Nagant's rifle. Although the form of the interrupter was slightly changed, this alteration was subsequently borrowed back by the Commission for the Model 1891. During the modernization of 1930, the form of the interrupter was further changed, from a single piece to a two-piece design, as the part had turned out to be one of the least reliable parts of the action. Only the clip for loading cartridges and the attachment of the magazine spring to the magazine base plate in subsequent models were designed by Nagant. Considering the rifle could be easily loaded without using a clip, one cartridge after another, the magazine spring attached to the magazine base plate is the only contribution of Nagant to all rifles after 1930.

Nagant's legal dispute
Despite the failure of Nagant's rifle, he filed a patent suit, claiming he was entitled to the sum the winner was to receive. It appeared that Nagant was the first to apply for the international patent protection over the interrupter, although he borrowed it from Mosin's design initially. Mosin could not apply for a patent since he was an officer of the Russian army, and the design of the rifle was owned by the Government and had the status of a military secret.

A scandal was about to burst out, with Nagant threatening he would not participate in trials held in Russia ever again and some officials proposing to expel Nagant from any further trials, as he borrowed the design of the interrupter after it was covered by the secrecy status given in Russia of that time to military inventions and therefore violated Russian law. Taking into consideration that Nagant was one of the few producers not engaged by competitive governments and generally eager to cooperate and share experience and technology, the Commission paid him a sum of 200,000 Russian rubles, equal to the premium that Mosin received as the winner. The rifle did not receive the name of Mosin, because of the personal decision taken by Tsar Alexander III, which was made based on the opinion of the Defence Minister Pyotr Vannovskiy: 
The Tsar himself dashed the word "Russian" from this document with his own hand. The decision to pay off Nagant proved wise, as he remained the major contractor for the Russian Government, and the Nagant M1895 revolver was subsequently adopted by the Russian army as its main sidearm.

However, in spite of the payment, Nagant attempted to use the situation for publicity, resulting in the name "Mosin–Nagant" appearing in the Western press.

From a technical point of view the rifle that came to be called "Mosin–Nagant" is the design proposed by Mosin as further amended by Mosin with some details borrowed from Nagant's design. Only since 1924 the rifle was officially named "Mosin's rifle" in the USSR, although some variants were still known only by their year of origin.

Russo-Japanese War
In 1889 Tsar Alexander III ordered the Russian army to meet or exceed European standards in rifle developments with "rifles of reduced caliber and cartridges with smokeless powder." The new weapons would entail “high velocities”, exceeding 600 meters per second (2,000 ft/s) and would result in land battles both commencing and being capable of being fought at longer ranges, nearly two kilometers. The new Mosin rifles would replace the Berdan rifles then in use by the Russian army.

The Mosin rifle was first tested in combat in 1893,  during clashes between Russian and Afghan troops  in the Pamirs.

The Russo-Japanese War (1904–1905) was the rifle's first major conflict. By the time the war broke out in 1904, approximately 3.8 million had been built, with over 1.5 million in the hands of the Russian cavalry and all of its reserves when hostilities commenced.

Between the adoption of the final design in 1891 and the year 1910, several variants and modifications to the existing rifles were made.

World War I

With the start of World War I, production was restricted to the M1891 dragoon and infantry models for the sake of simplicity. Due to the desperate shortage of arms and the shortcomings of a still-developing domestic industry, the Russian government ordered 1.5 million M1891 infantry rifles from Remington Arms and another 1.8 million from New England Westinghouse Company in the United States in 1915. Remington produced 750,000 rifles before production was halted by the 1917 October Revolution. Deliveries to Russia had amounted to 469,951 rifles when the Treaty of Brest-Litovsk ended hostilities between the Central Powers and now Soviet-Russia. Henceforth, the new Bolshevik government of Vladimir Lenin cancelled payments to the American companies manufacturing the Mosin–Nagant (Russia had not paid for the order at any time throughout the Great War).

With Remington and Westinghouse on the precipice of bankruptcy from the Communists' decision, the remaining 280,000 rifles were purchased by the United States Army. American and British expeditionary forces of the North Russia Campaign were armed with these rifles and sent to Murmansk and Arkhangelsk in the late summer of 1918 to prevent the large quantities of munitions delivered for Czarist forces from being captured by the Central Powers. Remaining rifles were used for the training of U.S. Army troops. Some were used to equip U.S. National Guard, SATC, and ROTC units. Designated "U.S. Rifle, 7.62mm, Model of 1916", these are among the rarest of American service arms. In 1917, 50,000 rifles were sent via Vladivostok to the Czechoslovak Legions in Siberia to aid in their attempt to secure passage to France.

Many of the New England Westinghouse and Remington Mosin–Nagants were sold to private citizens in the United States before World War II through the office of the Director of Civilian Marksmanship, the predecessor to the federal government's current Civilian Marksmanship Program.

Large numbers of Mosin–Nagants were captured by German and Austro-Hungarian forces and saw service with the rear-echelon forces of both armies, and also with the Imperial German Navy. Many of these weapons were sold to Finland in the 1920s.

Civil War, modernization, and wars with Finland
During the Russian Civil War, infantry and dragoon versions were still in production, though in dramatically reduced numbers. The rifle was widely used by all belligerents in the civil war. In 1924, following the victory of the Red Army, a committee was established to modernize the rifle, which had by then been in service for over three decades. This effort led to the development of the Model 91/30 rifle, which was based on the design of the original dragoon version. The sight measurements were converted from arshins to meters; and the front sight blade was replaced by a hooded post front sight less susceptible to being knocked out of alignment. There were also minor modifications to the bolt, but not enough to prevent interchangeability with the earlier Model 1891 and the so-called "Cossack dragoon" rifles.

Finland was a Grand Duchy in the Russian Empire until 1917, so Finns had long used the Mosin–Nagant in service with the Tsarist military. The rifle was used in the short civil war there and adopted as the service rifle of the new republic's army. Finland produced several variants of the Mosin–Nagant, all of them manufactured using the receivers of Russian-made, American-made, French-made or (later) Soviet-made rifles. Finland also utilized a number of captured M91 and M91/30 rifles with minimal modifications. As a result, the rifle was used on both sides of the Winter War and the Continuation War during World War II. Finnish Mosin–Nagants were produced by SAKO, Tikkakoski, and VKT, with some using barrels imported from Switzerland and Germany. In assembling M39 rifles, Finnish armorers re-used "hex" receivers that dated back as far as 1891. Finnish rifles are characterized by Russian, French or American-made receivers stamped with a boxed SA, as well as many other parts produced in those countries and barrels produced in Finland, Switzerland, Austria, Belgium and Germany. The Finns also manufactured two-piece "finger splice" stocks for their Mosin–Nagant rifles.

In addition, the rifle was distributed as aid to Republican anti-Franco forces in the Spanish Civil War. Spanish Civil War Mosins can be readily identified by the wire sling hangers inserted in the slots in the forearm and buttstock meant to take the Russian "dog collars" for Russian-style slings, so the rifles could accept Western European–style rifle slings.

World War II
At the beginning of the war, the Mosin–Nagant 91/30 was the standard issue weapon of Soviet troops. Millions were produced in World War II for use by the largest mobilized army in history.

The Mosin–Nagant Model 1891/30 was modified and adapted as a sniper rifle from 1932 onwards, first with mounts and scopes from Germany then with domestic designs (PE, PEM); from 1942 it was issued with 3.5-power PU fixed focus scopes. It served quite prominently in the brutal urban battles on the Eastern Front, such as the Battle of Stalingrad, which made heroes of such snipers as Vasily Zaitsev, Lyudmila Pavlichenko, Ivan Sidorenko, and Roza Shanina. Finland also employed the Mosin–Nagant as a sniper rifle, with similar success with their own designs and captured Soviet rifles. For example, Simo Häyhä is credited with having killed 505 Soviet soldiers, many of whom fell victim to his Finnish M/28-30 Mosin–Nagant rifle. Häyhä did not use a scope on his Mosin. In interviews Häyhä gave before his death, he said that the scope and mount designed by the Soviets required the shooter to expose himself too much and raise his head too high, increasing the chances of being spotted by the enemy. In addition, scopes tended to reflect sunlight when moved side to side, which gave away a sniper's position.

In 1935–1936, the 91/30 was again modified, this time to lower production time. The "hex" receiver was changed to a round receiver. When war with Germany broke out, the need to produce Mosin–Nagants in vast quantities led to a further simplification of machining and a falling-off in finish of the rifles. The wartime Mosins are easily identified by the presence of tool marks and rough finishing that never would have passed the inspectors in peacetime. However, despite a lack of both aesthetic focus and uniformity, the basic functionality of the Mosins was unimpaired.

In addition, in 1938 a carbine version of the Mosin–Nagant, the M38, was issued. The idea was to issue the M38 to troops such as combat engineers, signal corps, and artillerymen, who could conceivably need to defend themselves from sudden enemy advances, but whose primary duties lay behind the front lines. Significantly, the front sight of the M38 was positioned in such a way that the Model 91/30's cruciform bayonet could not be mounted to the muzzle even if a soldier obtained one.

An increase in urban combat led directly to the development of the Model M44 Mosin. In essence, the M44 is an M38 with a slightly modified forearm and with a permanently mounted cruciform bayonet that folds to the right when it is not needed. It was an improvement on the Model 91/30, particularly for urban warfare; but few M44s saw combat on the Eastern Front.

By the end of the war, approximately 19.8 million Mosin–Nagant rifles had been produced.

Increased world-wide use

In the years after World War II, the Soviet Union ceased production of all Mosin–Nagants and withdrew them from service in favor of the SKS series carbines and eventually the AK series rifles. Despite its increasing obsolescence, the Mosin–Nagant saw continued service throughout the Eastern bloc and the rest of the world for many decades to come. Mosin–Nagant rifles and carbines saw service on many fronts of the Cold War, from Korea and Vietnam to Afghanistan and along the Iron Curtain in Europe. They were kept not only as reserve stockpiles, but front-line infantry weapons as well. Finland was still producing the M39 Mosin–Nagant in small numbers as late as 1973.

Virtually every country that received military aid from the Soviet Union, China, and Eastern Europe during the Cold War used Mosin–Nagants at various times. Middle Eastern countries within the sphere of Soviet influence—Egypt, Syria, Iraq, Afghanistan and Palestinian fighters—have received them in addition to other more modern arms. Mosin–Nagants have also seen action in the hands of both Soviet and Mujahadeen forces in Afghanistan during the Soviet Union's occupation of the country during the 1970s and the 1980s. Their use in Afghanistan continued on well into the 1990s and the early 21st century by Northern Alliance forces.

2022 Russian invasion of Ukraine 
Even after the collapse of the Soviet Union, Mosin–Nagant rifles are still commonly found on modern battlefields around the world. Notably, Russia has issued the rifle to conscripts from both occupied regions of the Donbas, and to conscripted Russian civilians as part of Vladimir Putin's wider general mobilization during the 2022 Russian invasion of Ukraine.

Variants

Russia/USSR

 Model 1891 Infantry Rifle: The primary weapon of Russian and Red Army infantry from 1891 to 1930. Between 1891 and 1910 the following modifications were made to the design of the rifle:
 Changed sights.
 Inclusion of a reinforcing bolt through the finger groove (due to the adoption of a 147-grain pointed 'spitzer' round).
 Elimination of the steel finger rest behind the trigger guard.
 New barrel bands.
 Installation of slot-type sling mounts to replace the more traditional swivels.

 Dragoon Rifle: Intended for use by Dragoons:  shorter and  lighter than the M1891. The Dragoon rifle's dimensions are identical to the later M1891/30 rifle, and most Dragoon rifles were eventually reworked into M1891/30s. Most such rifles, known to collectors as "ex-Dragoons", can be identified by their pre-1930 date stampings, but small numbers of Dragoon rifles were produced from 1930 to 1932 and after reworking became impossible to distinguish from purpose-built M1891/30s.
 Cossack Rifle: Introduced for Cossack horsemen, it is almost identical to the Dragoon rifle but is sighted for use without a bayonet. These rifles were also issued without a bayonet.
 Model 1907 Carbine: At  shorter and  lighter than the M1891, this model was excellent for cavalry, engineers, signalers, and artillerymen. It was stocked nearly to the front sight and therefore did not take a bayonet. It was produced until at least 1917 in small numbers.

 Model 1891/30: The most prolific version of the Mosin–Nagant. It was produced for standard issue to all Soviet infantry from 1930 to 1945. Most Dragoon rifles were also converted to the M1891/30 standard. It was commonly used as a sniper rifle in World War II. Early sniper versions had a 3.87×30 PE or PEM scope, a Soviet-made copy of a Zeiss design, while later rifles used smaller, simpler, and easier-to-produce 3.5×21 PU scopes. Because the scope was mounted above the chamber, the bolt handle was replaced with a longer handled, bent version on sniper rifles (known to Mosin collectors and shooters as a "bent bolt") so the shooter could work the bolt without the scope interfering with it. Like the US M1903A4 Springfield sniper rifle, the location of the scope above the receiver prevents the use of stripper clips. Its design was based on the Dragoon rifle with the following modifications:
 Flat rear sights and restamping of sights in metres, instead of arshinii.
 A cylindrical receiver, replacing the octagonal receiver (commonly called "hex", but actually having five octagonal top flats and a round bottom rather than three octagonal bottom flats. It has six "sides" but is neither hexagonal nor octagonal in normal use of those terms). Early production 91/30s (from 1930 to 1936) and converted Dragoon rifles retained the octagonal receiver. These rifles are less common and regarded as generally more desirable by collectors.
 A hooded post front sight, replacing the blade on previous weapons.

 Model 1938 Carbine: A carbine based on the M1891/30 design that was produced from 1939 to 1945 at the Izhevsk arsenal and in 1940 and 1944 at Tula. They were intended for use by second-echelon and noncombatant troops. Very few M38 carbines were made in 1945 and are highly sought after by collectors. Essentially a M1891/30 with a shortened barrel and shortened stock (the M38 is 1000 millimeters (40 in) in overall length versus 1230 millimeters (48 in) overall length for the Model 91/30), this carbine did not accept a bayonet and was in fact designed so that the standard Model 91/30 bayonet would not fit it. However many M38 carbines were fitted into M44 stocks by the Soviets as a wartime expedient. M38s in the correct M38 stock command a premium over M38s in M44 pattern stocks. The M38 was replaced by the M44 carbine in 1944.
 Model 1944 Carbine: This carbine was introduced into service in late 1944 (with 50,000 service-test examples produced in 1943) and remained in production until 1948. They were produced from 1943 to 1948 at the Izhevsk arsenal and only 1944 at Tula. Its specifications are very similar to the M1938, with the unique addition of a permanently affixed, side-folding cruciform-spike bayonet. A groove for the folded bayonet is inlet into the right side of the stock.From February 1944,this type of carbine was issued to Red Army infantry troops as a replacement for the standard rifle. These were in use not only by the Soviet Union, but also its various satellite nations. Many of these were counterbored post-war.
 Model 1891/59 Carbine: Commonly called "91/59s," the M1891/59s were created by shortening M1891/30 rifles to carbine length, with rear sight numbers partially ground off to reflect reduced range. These rifles are almost clones of the M38 except for the ground off M91/30 rear sight. The "1891/59" marking on the receiver suggests the carbines were created in or after 1959. It was initially thought that Bulgaria or another Soviet satellite country performed the conversions in preparation for a Western invasion that never came. Recent evidence suggests that the M91/59 was indeed produced in Bulgaria from Soviet-supplied wartime production M91/30s. Total production of the 91/59 is uncertain; figures as low as one million and as high as three million have appeared in firearm literature.
 AV: Soviet target rifle
 OTs-48/OTs-48K: The OTs-48/OTs-48K (ОЦ-48К) sniper rifle was designed around 2000 in an attempt to make use of many surplus Mosin M1891/30 rifles which were still held in storage in Russia. Developed and manufactured "on order" by Central Design Bureau for Sporting and Hunting Arms (TSKIB SOO) in the city of Tula, this rifle is still in limited use by some Russian law enforcement agencies today.

Estonia
After the Estonian War of Independence, Estonia had around 120,000 M/1891s in stock, later the Kaitseliit, the Estonian national guard, received some Finnish M28/30 rifles, a few modernised variants were also made by the Estonian Armory;
 M1933 or 1891/33 was standard rifle of Estonian armed forces.
 M1938: a further variant of M1933, 12,000 rifles.
 KL300: a variant for Kaitseliit, 4,025 were made.
 M1935 "Lühendatud sõjapüss M1935": "shortened rifle M1935" was a shortened variant of M1933 with 600mm barrel, 6,770 rifles.

Finland

Most Finnish Rifles were assembled by SAKO, Tikkakoski Oy, or VKT (Valtion Kivääritehdas, State Rifle Factory, after the wars part of Valtion Metallitehtaat (Valmet), State Metalworks). The Finnish cartridge 7.62×53mmR is a slightly modified variation of the Russian 7.62×54mmR, and is considered interchangeable with 54R. However, the older version of the Finnish military cartridge was loaded with the S-type bullet that had nominal diameter of .308. In 1936 the Finnish Army fielded a new standard service cartridge intended for both machine guns and rifles. This new cartridge was loaded with a new bullet designed in 1934–the D-166, which had a nominal diameter of .310. The new service rifle m/39 was designed from the start around the D-166 thus it had nominal barrel diameter of .310.

Handloaded cartridges for Finnish rifles should however use a  bullet for use with other Finnish Mosin–Nagant variants instead of the  one which gives best results in M39, Soviet and most of other Mosin–Nagant rifles.
 M/91: When Finland achieved independence from Russia, over 190,000 Model 1891 infantry rifles were already stockpiled in the ex-Russian military depots within Finland. As a result, the rifle was adopted as the standard Finnish Army weapon, and surplus Mosin–Nagants were purchased from other European nations which had captured them during World War I. These rifles were overhauled to meet Finnish Army standards and designated M/91. In the mid-1920s Tikkakoski made new barrels for m/91s. Later starting in 1940, Tikkakoski and VKT began production of new M/91 rifles. VKT production ceased in 1942 in favor of the newer M/39 rifle, but Tikkakoski production continued through 1944. The M/91 was the most widely issued Finnish rifle in both the Winter War and the Continuation War.
 M/91rv: A cavalry rifle built from former Russian Model 1891 Dragoon rifles, modified with a sling slot based on the German Karabiner 98a. The original Russian sling slots were also retained.
 M/24: The "Lotta Rifle", the Model 24 or Model 1891/24 was the first large-scale Mosin–Nagant upgrade project undertaken by the Finnish Suojeluskunta (Civil Guard), and there were, in fact three separate variations of the rifle. Barrels were produced by SIG (Schweizerische Industrie Gesellschaft) and by a German consortium. Swiss-produced barrels could be found in both standard Mosin–Nagant 1891 contour and in a heavier contour designed for improved accuracy, while all German-produced barrels were heavy weight barrels. The initial contract for the SIG-produced barrels was let on April 10, 1923, and was for 3,000 new barrels produced with the original Model 1891 barrel contour. A subsequent contract for 5,000 additional heavier barrels, stepped at the muzzle end to accept the standard Mosin–Nagant bayonet, was let the next year. The German contracts, starting in 1924 and running to 1926, were all for the heavier, stepped barrels with two contracts: one for 5,000 barrels and a second for 8,000 barrels. The German-made barrels are marked "Bohler-Stahl" on the under side of the chamber. All Model 24s are marked with the Civil Guard logo of three fir tree sprigs over a capital "S." All Model 24s are equipped with a coil spring around the trigger pin to improve the trigger pull and thus the accuracy of the rifle. The Model 24 was called the Lotta's Rifle ("Lottakivääri") after the women's auxiliary of the Civil Guard, known as the Lotta Svärd which was instrumental in raising funds to purchase and repair or refurbish some 10,000 rifles.
 M/27: The Model 27 was the Finnish Army's first almost complete reworking of the Model 1891, it was nicknamed Pystykorva (literally "spitz") due to the front sight protector resembling the ears of a spitz. The receiver and magazine of the 1891 were retained, but a new shorter-length heavy-weight barrel was fitted. The sights were modified. The receivers and bolts were modified with "wings" being fitted to the bolt connecting bars that fit into slots machined into the receivers. The stocks were initially produced by cutting down 1891 stocks and opening up the barrel channels to accommodate the heavier barrel. New barrel bands and nose caps were fitted and a new bayonet was issued. The modified stocks proved to be weak, breaking when soldiers practiced bayonet fighting or firing with the bayonet fitted. These and other problems resulted in a slow-down of production in the mid-1930s while solutions to problems were engineered and existing stocks of rifles were modified. Produced from mid-1927 to 1940, the Model 27 was the Finnish Army's main battle rifle in the Winter War.
 M/27rv: A cavalry carbine version of the M27, rv is short for ratsuväki (literally mounted force). 2217 were made, and were assigned to the most elite Finnish cavalry units. As a result of their heavy use, nearly half were lost over the course of the Winter and Continuation Wars. Most of the surviving examples were deemed beyond repair and scrapped, with slightly over 300 still existing. This makes it the rarest of all Finnish Mosin–Nagant models.
 M/28: A variant designed by the White Guard. The M/28 differs from the Army's M/27 primarily in the barrel band design, which is a single piece compared to the M/27's hinged band, and an improved trigger design. Barrels for the M/28 were initially purchased from SIG, and later from Tikkakoski and SAKO.
 M/28-30: An upgraded version of the M/28. The most noticeable modification is the new rear sight design. The same sight was used in following M39 rifle only exception being "1.5" marking for closest range to clarify it for users. According to micrometer measurements and comparison to modern Lapua D46/47 bullet radar trajectory data, markings are matched to Finnish Lapua D46/D46 bullet surprisingly accurately through whole adjustment range between 150 m and 2000 m.
The trigger was also improved by adding coil spring to minimize very long pre-travel. Following M39 does not have this improvement. The magazine was also modified to prevent jamming. Magazines were stamped with "HV" (Häiriö Vapaa = Jam Free) letters in right side of rifle. Later M39 uses identical design, but without "HV" -stamp. M/28-30 also have metal sleeve in fore-end of handguard, to reduce barrel harmonics change and to make barrel-stock contact more constant between shots and/or during environmental changes such as moisture and temperature. Later M39 does not have this upgrade.

In addition to its military usage, approximately 440 M/28-30 rifles were manufactured by SAKO for use in the 1937 World Shooting Championships in Helsinki.

M/28-30 model, serial number 60974, was also used by Simo Häyhä, a well-known Finnish sniper. M28/30 was used as Civil Guards competition rifle before World War II, as was the case with Simo Häyhä's personal rifle. Therefore, rifles were built very well, with highest grade barrels available and carefully matched headspace. Häyhä's rifle was still at PKarPr (Northern Karelia Brigade) museum in 2002, then moved to an unknown place by the Finnish Army.
 M/91-35: A model proposed by the Finnish Army to replace both its M/27 and the White Guard's M/28 and M/28-30 rifles. The White Guard strongly objected to this plan, considering the M91/35 to have poor accuracy and excessive muzzle flash. It was never adopted, instead being supplanted by the M/39.
 M/39: nicknamed "Ukko-Pekka" after the former President Pehr Evind Svinhufvud, a compromise between the Army and White Guard, adopted so as to standardize Mosin–Nagant production. The M/39 was derived largely from the M28-30, but included some alterations proposed by the Army. The M/39 also incorporated a semi-pistol grip into the stock, though some early examples used typical Mosin–Nagant straight stocks. Only 10 rifles were completed by the end of the Winter War, but 96,800 were produced after the Winter War and used in the Continuation War. Small numbers were assembled from leftover parts in the late 1960s through 1973, bringing the total production to approximately 102,000.
 M/30: Tikkakoski produced improved, high-quality Model 1891/30 rifles in 1943 and 1944, designated M/30, using new barrels and parts from some of the almost 125,000 1891/30s captured in the Winter and Continuation Wars as well as 57,000 rifles bought from the Germans in 1944 (most of which were only suitable for use as parts donors). They were produced with both one- and two-piece stocks and either Soviet globe or Finnish blade foresights.
 M/56: An experimental 7.62×39mm version.
 M/28-57: A biathlon 7.62×54mmR version.
 M/28-76: A special marksman and target rifle for continuation training and competition, produced in two different versions by the Finnish Army. They were built from modified M/28-30 and M/39 rifles.

Czechoslovakia
 VZ91/38 Carbine: Very similar to the M91/59, it is an M38-style carbine produced by cutting down Model 1891 Infantry, Dragoon, and Cossack rifles. Few of these carbines exist, and the reason for their creation remains unclear. Like the M44, they have a bayonet groove cut into the right side of the stock, despite there being no evidence that the VZ91/38 design ever included a bayonet. The front sight features a wide base similar to post World War II M44's.
 VZ54 Sniper Rifle: Based on the M1891/30, although it has the appearance of a modern sporting firearm. The VZ54 utilizes a Czech-made 2.5× magnification scope, as well as a unique rear sight. It also borrows some features from the Mauser design, such as locking screws and a K98k-style front sight hood.
 VZ54/91 Sniper Rifle: Updated version of the VZ54 Sniper Rifle. The VZ54/91 utilizes an adjustable biathlon style stock with fully adjustable comb and butt plate. A rail beneath the forearm accepts adjustable sling swivels as well as a bipod. A Soviet manufactured PSO-1 scope also used on the SVD Dragunov sniper rifle is mounted on a side plate. It retains the front and rear sights of the VZ54.

China

 Type 53: A license-built version of the post-war Soviet M1944 carbine. As many of the carbines imported to the United States are constructed of both local Chinese parts and surplus Soviet parts, there is much debate as to when this mixture occurred. Type 53s are found both with and without the permanently attached folding bayonet, though the former is far more common. The Chinese Type 53 carbine saw extensive service with the People's Liberation Army from 1953 until the late 1950s/early 1960s when the PLA went over to the Chinese Type 56 carbine and the Chinese Type 56 assault rifle. Many Type 53 carbines were given to the People's Militia in China and to North Vietnam (with many carbines ending up in the hands of the National Liberation Front in South Vietnam) and to the Khmer Rouge in Cambodia during the 1960s and 1970s. The People's Militia used the Type 53 until 1982 when they were replaced with modern weapons. There is some evidence that the Type 53 carbine saw extensive use in the hands of the People's Militia during the years of the Great Leap Forward and the Cultural Revolution. A significant number of Type 53 carbines were given to Albania and a few African countries as military aid by the Chinese during the 1960s. Some of these carbines appeared in the hands of the Kosovo Liberation Army during the late 1990s.

Hungary
 Mosin–Nagant Model 1948 Infantry Rifle Gyalogsági Puska, 48.M (48.Minta) Produced by the FÉG (Fémáru- Fegyver- és Gépgyár Rt.) plant in Budapest, these high-quality versions of the Soviet Model 1891/30 were produced from 1949 to possibly as late as 1955. They are characterized by a high-quality finish and the marking of all parts with the "02" stamp.
 Fémaru- Fegyver- és Gépgyár (FÉG) manufactured a M1891 sniper version based on the 48 in the 1950s. This model was used extensively by the North Vietnamese Army (NVA) during the Vietnam War.

 M/52: a direct copy of the original Soviet Model 1891/30 sniper rifle. Identifying features include:
 Darkly blued steel and high quality machining.
 An "02" stamp on every component of the rifle, identifying it as manufactured in Hungary
 M44 Pattern: Domestically produced version of post war pattern Soviet M44 Carbine marked "02".

Romania
 Triangular shaped markings, some with an arrow inside, on many components of the rifle. Normally three "R"'s surrounded by crossed stalks with leaves pointing outwards are on the top of the breech. Year stamps are quite visible. The trigger assembly is unique in the Romanian 91/30 and is adjustable. It is not interchangeable with other Mosins.
 M44 Pattern: Domestically produced version of post war pattern Soviet M44 Carbine during the years 1953 to 1955. Variances to the Soviet pattern produced minor differences.
 Suppressed M44 Pattern: Domestically produced adaptation of the M44, with a long integral suppressor and an LPS 4×6° TIP2 telescopic sight, same as the one used on the PSL rifle. Only a small number were modified, for use with the USLA – a very small counter-terrorism unit of the Securitate
 M91/30 Pattern: Domestically produced version Soviet pattern M91 during the year 1955. Some of the guns are marked "INSTRUCTIE" and held in reserve for a secondary line of defense in case of invasion. The Instructie mark is typically, but not always, accompanied by a broad red band on the buttstock. Some collectors do not consider these safe to fire, but most appear to be in good working order although well worn and somewhat neglected. The "EXERCITIU" mark is found on rifles that seem to have been used specifically for training purposes only. The "EXERCITIU" rifles are easily recognized by the black paint on the entire butt of the stock. They are not intended to be fired since the firing pin is clipped and many times parts critical to their proper function are missing.

Poland

 wz. 91/98/23: conversion to the 7.92mmx57 Mauser cartridge, with a magazine modified to feed rimless cartridges. Utilized original Russian spike bayonet.
 wz. 91/98/25: conversion to the 7.92mmx57 Mauser cartridge, with a magazine modified to feed rimless cartridges and a bayonet mounting bar to allow the use of Mauser 1898 bayonets.
 wz. 91/98/26: conversion to the 7.92mmx57 Mauser cartridge, with a magazine modified to feed rimless cartridges and a bayonet mounting bar to allow the use of Mauser 1898 bayonets. Modified two-piece ejector/interrupter similar to Mauser pattern rifles.
 wz. 44: Domestically produced version of post war pattern Soviet M44 Carbine, Marked with the Polish "circle 11."
 wz. 48: A Polish single shot military trainer modeled in the image of the Mosin Nagant M38 carbine. Produced from 1948 until 1960, the wz48 was used to train Czech and Polish military cadets. It is chambered in .22 Long Rifle.

United States
 Russian three-line rifle, caliber 7.62mm (.30 inches): Due to the desperate shortage of arms and the shortcomings of a still-developing domestic industry, the Russian government ordered 1.5 million M1891 infantry rifles from Remington Arms and another 1.8 million from New England Westinghouse in the United States. Most of these rifles were not delivered before the outbreak of the October Revolution and the subsequent signing of the Treaty of Brest-Litovsk which ended hostilities between the Central Powers and Soviet Russia. When the Bolsheviks formed a new government, they defaulted on the Imperial Russian contracts with the American arsenals, with the result that New England Westinghouse and Remington were stuck with hundreds of thousands of Mosin–Nagants. The US government bought up the remaining stocks, saving Remington and Westinghouse from bankruptcy. The rifles in Great Britain armed the US and British expeditionary forces sent to North Russia in 1918 and 1919. The rifles still in the US ended up being primarily used as training firearms for the US Army. Some were used to equip US National Guard, SATC and ROTC units. Collectors have taken to calling these rifles, "U.S. Magazine Rifle, 7.62mm, Model of 1916", though no official source for this designation has ever been cited. Ordnance documents refer to the rifles as "Russian three-line rifle, caliber 7.62mm (.30 inches)". In 1917, 50,000 of these rifles were sent via Vladivostok to equip the Czechoslovak Legions in Siberia to aid in their attempt to secure passage to France. During the interwar period, the rifles which had been taken over by the US military were sold to private citizens in the United States by the Director of Civilian Marksmanship, the predecessor agency to the current Civilian Marksmanship Program. They were sold for the sum of $3.00 each. If unaltered to chamber the US standard .30-06 Springfield rimless cartridge, these rifles are prized by collectors because they do not have the import marks required by law to be stamped or engraved on military surplus firearms brought into the United States from other countries.

Civilian use
Mosin–Nagants have been exported from Finland since the 1960s as its military modernized and decommissioned the rifles. Most of these have ended up as inexpensive surplus for Western nations.

In USSR surplus military carbines (without bayonet) were sold as civilian hunting weapons. Also, the Mosin–Nagant action has been used to produce a limited number of commercial rifles, the most famous are the Vostok brand target rifles exported in Europe in the 1960s and 1970s chambered in the standard 7.62×54mmR round and in 6.5×54mmR, a necked-down version of the original cartridge designed for long range target shooting. Rifles in 6.5×54mmR use a necked-down 7.62×54mmR cartridge and were the standard rifle of the USSR's Olympic biathlon team until the International Olympic Committee revised the rules of the event to reduce the range to 50 meters and required all competitors to use rifles chambered in .22LR.

A number of the Model 1891s produced by New England Westinghouse and Remington were sold to private citizens in the United States by the U.S. government through the Director of Civilian Marksmanship Program between the two World Wars. Rifles from this program are valuable collectibles. Many of these American-made Mosin–Nagants were rechambered by wholesalers to the ubiquitous American .30-06 Springfield cartridge; some were done crudely, and others were professionally converted. Regardless of the conversion, a qualified gunsmith should examine the rifle before firing, and owners should use caution before firing commercial ammunition.

With the fall of the Iron Curtain, a large quantity of Mosin–Nagants have found their way onto markets outside of Russia as collectibles and hunting rifles. Due to the large surplus created by the Soviet small arms industry during World War II and the tendency of the former Soviet Union to retain and store large quantities of old but well-preserved surplus (long after other nations' militaries divested themselves of similar vintage materials), these rifles (mostly M1891/30 rifles and M1944 carbines) are inexpensive compared to other surplus arms of the same era.

There is collector interest in the Mosin–Nagant family of rifles, and they are popular with hobby shooters and hunters. The notched rear tangent iron sight is adjustable for elevation, and is calibrated in hundreds of meters (arshins on earlier models). The front sight is a post that is not adjustable for elevation. Sight adjustment for windage was made by the armory before issue by drifting the sight left or right in its dovetail.

The limited sight adjustment leaves some hunters with the desire to add a scope, leading two companies to make adjustable sights for the Russian version of this rifle, Mojo and Smith-Sights. Several companies also make scope mounts for pistol scopes that can be mounted to the rear sight of the Model 91/30 without drilling or tapping.

, bolt on mounts make it possible to fit a modern proprietary or Picatinny/Weaver rail compatible scope to the rifle without the need to drill or tap the weapon. Also available are bolt on muzzle brakes that reduce recoil and counter muzzle rise.

Several American companies manufacture aftermarket rifle stocks that come inletted so a Mosin can be dropped directly into the stock without additional modification, for shooters who would prefer their ex-military rifles look more like civilian-made hunting rifles.

Other companies are experimenting with detachable, and semi-permanent magazine extensions which would increase the magazine capability from five rounds to ten rounds.

Users

Current Users

 : Acquired from the People's Republic of China.
 : First M1891s were received from the Russian Empire in the 1890s. Received new rifles in the 1950s. Still in use by the 101st Alpine Regiment.
 : Acquired from the People's Republic of China during the Cold War.
 : Acquired from the Soviet Union and the People's Republic of China during the Cold War.
 : Acquired from the Soviet Union during the Cold War.
 : Inherited after independence in 1991. Saw use as a sniper rifle in the Armed Forces since 1991 to 2004, replaced by more modern weapons, used as ceremonial weapon.
 Hayat Tahrir al-Sham
 : Used by the Marine Corps for training.
 
 : Inherited from the Soviet Union after independence.
 : Received from China, North Vietnam, and the Soviet Union.
 
 
 : Ceremonial use. Minor use seen in Russo-Ukrainian War.
  Shining Path: Acquired from the People's Republic of China.
 
 
 
  (selected security detachments of the Ministry of Internal Affairs)
 
 : Used by the National Bolivarian Militia of Venezuela as their standard-issue rifle.

Former users

 : Acquired sometime in the 1930s by the Afghan Army. The M44 variant was used by the former Afghan Honor Guard.
  Albania
 
  First Republic of Armenia: Inherited from the Russian Empire upon independence in 1918.
  Captured during World War I, sold to Finland in the 1920s.
 : Inherited from the Soviet Union both during independence in 1918 and after independence in 1991.
 : Supplied by the USSR or White Russians during Warlord Era, most to either the NRA or to warlord armies.
 : Received Mosin variant rifles from the Soviet Union during the 1930s and 1940s. M44 carbines used by the People's Volunteer Army in the Korean War. Licensed copy of the M44 carbine (Type 53) produced in China for the PLA and the People's Militia.
 : Briefly used Model 1891s from the Czechoslovak Legions until switching to Mauser variants after the First World War. After the Soviet-backed coup in 1948, Czechoslovakia began converting M91 rifles to M91/38 carbines in the late 1950s. The Czechs developed a Mosin derivative sniper rifle known as the Vz.54 sniper rifle.
 : Inherited Model 1891s from the Russian Empire after independence. Acquired Finnish variants such as the M28/30 and domestically produced Estonian variants such as the Model 1891/33 and Model 1891/38 until Soviet Annexation.
 : Given to Ethiopia in the late 1890s and serviced in the First Italo-Ethiopian War, alongside the Berdan rifle. In 1912,  despite the protests of Russia, several thousand captured Russian rifles were purchased by the Ethiopian army from Japan, those were in extremely poor technical condition. received some M44 carbines during the Ogaden War.
: The Châtellerault arsenal produced 500,000 Model 1891s from 1892 to 1895 under contract to the Russian Empire to speed up Russia's rearmament.
 : Inherited from the Soviet Union both during independence in 1918.
  M44 variant (designated the Karabiner 44) was used by the Grenztruppen and KdA in the 50s and 60s. 
 : Captured during World War I, sold to Finland in the 1920s.
  (large stockpiles of Soviet weapons were captured and designated as the Gewehr 252–256 series following Operation Barbarossa)
 : Type 53s reported by American Marines after the Invasion of Grenada.
 :M91 and M91/30 rifles were supplied by the CIA during the 1954 coup, reportedly they were obtained through Interarmco 
 :Surplus Mosins converted to 30-06 were bought from the Bannerman firm shortly before WW2
 : Produced M91/30s acquired from the Soviet Union from 1950 to 1954 as well as M44 and PU sniper variants. Used during the Hungarian Revolution of 1956.
 : Used by Haganah.
 : Received some from Austria-Hungary as war reparations from World War I before they were sold to Finland.
  Italian resistance: Later used by partisans during the Italian Civil War
 : Formerly had stockpiles of M1891 rifles captured from Imperial Russian forces during the Russo-Japanese War and the Japanese intervention in Siberia. Many converted to single shot training rifles.
  Kosovo Liberation Army: Used the Type 53 rifle.
 : Inherited from the Soviet Union after independence.
 : Inherited large amounts of Model 1891s from the former Russian Empire after Independence. Domestically produced Model 1891/30s in small quantities before the Soviet Annexation.
 
 : Inherited large amounts of Model 1891s from the Russian Empire after independence.
 : People's Movement for the Liberation of Azawad
 : 5,000 U.S.-made rifles received after World War I
 : 40,000 bought in 1898-1905, standard rifle during the First Balkan War
 
  (U.S. made)
 
 : used at the end of World War I Captured from Soviets during World War II, also received as aid after joining the allies
  Socialist Republic of Romania 
 
 
  Spain: Sent from Mexico and Soviet Union
 
 : Used between 1914-1940s. Saw action in World War I (captured rifles) and Independence War (Soviet-supplied rifles).
 : Used during the Siberian intervention.
  (U.S. Rifle, 3 line rifle, Model of 1916)
 : Formerly used by the Việt Minh, the Viet Cong and the North Vietnamese Army. The M44/Type-53 carbines were known as K44 or red stock rifles and a detachable grenade launcher, the AT-44, was designed. The North Vietnamese Army also used the M1891/30 modified as a sniper rifle.

See also
 List of Russian weaponry

References

Bibliography
 

 Kokalis, Peter G. (2003). "White Death". The Shotgun News Treasury Issue Volume 4. Primedia Publishing.
 
 
 
 
 .

External links

7.62×53mmR rifles 
7.62×54mmR rifles
7.92×57mm Mauser rifles 
8×50mmR Mannlicher rifles 
Weapons and ammunition introduced in 1891
Early rifles
Bolt-action rifles
Rifles of the Russian Empire
Rifles of the United States
Bolt-action rifles of the Soviet Union
World War I Russian infantry weapons
Russo-Japanese war weapons of Russia
World War II infantry weapons of the Soviet Union
Cold War firearms of the Soviet Union
Rifles of the Cold War
World War II rifles